

Ulrich Otto Eduard Kessler (3 November 1894 – 27 March 1983) was a German general (General der Flieger) in the Luftwaffe during World War II. He was a recipient of the Knight's Cross of the Iron Cross, awarded by Nazi Germany to recognise extreme battlefield bravery or successful military leadership.

Prior to the War Kessler had been in the Navy. He served as German Naval Attaché to the disarmament conference in Geneva, where he claimed to have befriended US Secretary of State Henry L. Stimson.

Ulrich Kessler was captured on 15 May 1945 while on board  by a 15-man boarding party from the destroyer . He was returning to active duty as Chief of the Luftwaffe-Liaison-Staff Tokyo and Air-Attache at the German Embassy in Tokyo. On the voyage, according to Fehler, relations between Kessler and a convinced Nazi passenger, naval judge Kay Nieschling, became very strained.

Awards and decorations
 German Cross in Gold (3 April 1944)
 Knight's Cross of the Iron Cross on 8 April 1944 as Generalleutnant and Fliegerführer Atlantik

Citations

Bibliography

 
 
 

1894 births
1983 deaths
Military personnel from Gdańsk
People from West Prussia
Luftwaffe World War II generals
German diplomats
Recipients of the clasp to the Iron Cross, 1st class
Recipients of the Hanseatic Cross (Lübeck)
Recipients of the Gold German Cross
Recipients of the Knight's Cross of the Iron Cross
German prisoners of war in World War II held by the United States
Imperial German Navy personnel of World War I
Generals of Aviators